Malmö FF is a Swedish football club and former sports club in Malmö.

Malmö FF may also refer to:
 Malmö Redhawks – formerly known as Malmö FF Hockey
 FC Rosengård – formerly known as Malmö FF Dam